Vladimir "Guma" Bogdanović (born 5 October 1986) is a Serbian footballer who plays for FC Petrocub Hîncești in the Moldovan National Division.

Bogdanović started his career at FK Jedinstvo Ub before joining Red Star. He was then loaned to FK Smederevo and came back to Red Star prior to the Serbian Superliga 2007-08 season. He transferred to Chinese club Liaoning Whowin at March 2011.  In July 2012 he signed a 1-year contract with Greek club Panetolikos F.C., after being on trial for a week.  He was released on 20 January 2013. After Greece, Bogdanovic played 2 seasons in Azerbaijan's team AZAL, after which exceeds the Moldovan Veris Chișinău. In July 2015, he returned to Serbian Superliga, and will perform in Radnički Niš.
In July 2016, he signed for Borac Čačak.

References

External links
 Profile and stats at Srbijafudbal
 
 

1986 births
Living people
Sportspeople from Kraljevo
Serbian footballers
Serbian expatriate footballers
Expatriate footballers in China
Expatriate footballers in Bulgaria
Expatriate footballers in Greece
Expatriate footballers in Moldova
FK Jedinstvo Ub players
FK Radnički Niš players
FK Borac Čačak players
FK Smederevo players
Red Star Belgrade footballers
Liaoning F.C. players
FC Lokomotiv 1929 Sofia players
Panetolikos F.C. players
Speranța Nisporeni players
CS Petrocub Hîncești players
Serbian SuperLiga players
Chinese Super League players
First Professional Football League (Bulgaria) players
Football League (Greece) players
Association football midfielders